Urie McCleary (July 10, 1905 – December 12, 1980) was an American art director. He won two Academy Awards and was nominated for four more in the category Best Art Direction. He was born in Arkansas and died in Los Angeles, California.

Selected filmography
McCleary won two Academy Awards and was nominated for four more for Best Art Direction:

Won
 Blossoms in the Dust (1941)
 Patton (1970)

Nominated
 National Velvet (1944)
 Young Bess (1953)
 Raintree County (1957)
 A Patch of Blue (1965)

References

External links

1905 births
1980 deaths
American art directors
Artists from Arkansas
Best Art Direction Academy Award winners